Robinsonella is a genus of flowering plants in the family Malvaceae. It contains sixteen species of trees occurring from Costa Rica to southern Mexico, eight of which occur in the Mexican state of Chiapas.

Species
As of 2022, the following species are recognised in the genus Robinsonella:

Robinsonella brevituba 
Robinsonella chiangii 
Robinsonella cordata 
Robinsonella densiflora 
Robinsonella discolor 
Robinsonella erasmi-sosae 
Robinsonella glabrifolia 
Robinsonella hintonii 
Robinsonella lindeniana 
Robinsonella macvaughii 
Robinsonella mirandae 
Robinsonella pilosa 
Robinsonella pilosissima 
Robinsonella pleiopoda 
Robinsonella samaricarpa 
Robinsonella speciosa

In culture
Trees of Robinsonella speciosa are traditionally grown as ornamental plants in the gardens of the Tojolabal and Tzeltal city of Comitán de Domínguez in the highlands of southern Chiapas, where it is called tenocté; it has beautiful white flowers which appear in May before the leaves do. According to traditional knowledge, it is important for women never to touch the tree, especially when it is in flower, for it will cause them to immediately elope with their boyfriends, and even worse, with whichever man that passes their sight.

References

Malveae
Malvaceae genera
Taxonomy articles created by Polbot